Edgard Frankignoul (1882–1954) was a Belgian inventor.

1882 births
1954 deaths
20th-century Belgian inventors
Walloon movement activists